UFC 127: Penn vs. Fitch was a mixed martial arts event held by the Ultimate Fighting Championship on Sunday, 27 February 2011 at Acer Arena in Sydney, Australia. Due to the time zone difference it aired live on Saturday, 26 February in North America. This was the second UFC event held in Sydney, following the sold-out UFC 110 in 2010.

Background
Tickets for UFC Fight Club members went on sale on 14 December 2010. UFC 127 sold out moments after going on public sale on 16 December 2010, selling faster than tickets for UFC 110, and making it the fastest-selling event, along with UFC 115, in UFC history.

ESPN UK aired the Ross Pearson vs. Spencer Fisher fight, which was confirmed by Jon Anik on MMA Live. Ion Television aired the Pearson vs. Fisher, Te-Huna vs. Gustafsson and Ring vs. Fukuda preliminary bouts, while the Perosh vs. Blackledge and Zhang vs. Rheinhardt preliminary bouts were streamed on the UFC's official Facebook page.

On 9 February, it was announced that a knee injury had forced Carlos Condit out of his bout with Chris Lytle. Condit was replaced by promotional newcomer Brian Ebersole.

Results

Bonus awards
Fighters were awarded $75,000 bonuses.

Fight of the Night: Brian Ebersole vs. Chris Lytle
Knockout of the Night: Mark Hunt
Submission of the Night: Kyle Noke

References

Ultimate Fighting Championship events
2011 in mixed martial arts
Mixed martial arts in Australia
Sports competitions in Sydney
2011 in Australian sport